Leptoglanis is a genus of loach catfishes found in Africa.  There are currently two described species in this genus.

Species
 Leptoglanis bouilloni Poll, 1959
 Leptoglanis xenognathus Boulenger, 1902

References
 

Amphiliidae
Fish of Africa
Catfish genera
Taxa named by George Albert Boulenger
Freshwater fish genera